Jamulu Kandi (also Romanized as Jamūlū Kandī; also known as Jamlū (Persian: جملو), Jom‘ehlū and Jūmīlū) is a village in Angut-e Sharqi Rural District, Anguti District, Germi County, Ardabil Province, Iran. At the 2006 census, its population was 142, in 32 families.

References 

Towns and villages in Germi County